Stevie Reeves (born May 16, 1967) is an American professional stock car racing driver and spotter.

Driving career
After several seasons racing on the bullrings (short tracks) of Indiana, Reeves traveled nationally with the United States Automobile Club and wound up winning back-to-back USAC National Midget titles in 1992 for the Wilke Racers and in 1993 for midget car owner Steve Lewis.

After collecting those two titles, Reeves ventured into the NASCAR Busch Grand National Series in 1994 joining Mark Thomas Racing with Clabber Girl sponsorship on the number 96 Chevrolet. In 1995, Reeves collected his first pole at Bristol Motor Speedway and got his first top 10 with a sixth-place finish at Richmond International Raceway.  His career best finish in the final points standings for the Busch Series was in 1997 when he took 20th place.

Ultimately his career in the Busch Series was for the most part underwhelming. He never could hold a steady ride in his NASCAR career, which lasted from 1994 to 1998.  Reeves was employed by five different car owners in his five seasons (Mark Thomas, Ed Whitaker, Mike Curb, Donald Laird, and David Ridling).

After his stint in Busch, Reeves returned to his roots in open-wheel racing in 1998.  Reeves made his first start in the Indy Racing League at the Charlotte Motor Speedway in North Carolina on July 25 of that year, finishing an impressive 10th for Pagan Racing. He drove three more IRL races in 2000 for Logan Racing, suffering mechanical failures in each event.

Reeves returned to the USAC Silver Crown Series in 1998, wheeling the Johnny Vance/Raybestos No. 28 Beast.

Spotting
In 2005, he was employed with Dale Earnhardt, Inc. in NASCAR spotting for Paul Menard in the Busch series. He also drove in the USAC Silver Crown Series. Reeves was the spotter for Dale Earnhardt Jr. in the 2004 Daytona 500, Earnhardt's first win in the event.

Reeves moved Hendrick Motorsports in 2007 as the spotter of Jimmie Johnson's No. 48 team, replacing Earl Barban. With Reeves, Johnson won 16 races and the 2007 and 2008 championships, but Reeves was laid off after the 2008 season.

After working as a spotter for JTG Daugherty Racing's No. 47 car of Ryan Preece, Reeves joined Christopher Bell's No. 95 Leavine Family Racing team in 2020.

Racing record

American Open Wheel
(key)

IndyCar results

NASCAR
(key) (Bold – Pole position awarded by qualifying time. Italics – Pole position earned by points standings or practice time. * – Most laps led.)

Busch Series

Craftsman  Truck Series

References

External links
 

1967 births
IndyCar Series drivers
Living people
NASCAR drivers
People from Marion County, Indiana
Racing drivers from Indiana
Racing drivers from Indianapolis
USAC Silver Crown Series drivers